In the United States at the end of World War II, there were prisoner-of-war camps, including 175 Branch Camps serving 511 Area Camps containing over 425,000 prisoners of war (mostly German). The camps were located all over the US, but were mostly in the South, due to the higher expense of heating the barracks in colder areas.  Eventually, every state (with the exceptions of Nevada, North Dakota, and Vermont) had at least one POW camp.  Some of the camps were designated "segregation camps", where Nazi "true believers" were separated from the rest of the prisoners, whom they terrorized and even killed for being friendly with their American captors. Approximately 90% of Italian POWs pledged to help the United States, by volunteering in Italian Service Units (ISU). Due to a labor shortage, Italian Service Units worked on Army depots, in arsenals and hospitals, and on farms. POWs who were a part of the ISU received better housing, uniforms and pay.   

At its peak in May 1945, a total of 425,871 POWs were held in the US. This included 371,683 Germans, 50,273 Italians, and 3,915 Japanese.

See also
Camp Ruston
German prisoners of war in the United States

Footnotes

External links 
 A nearly complete list of all camps
 Camp Rucker (Fort Rucker), Alabama
 The German POW camps of Michigan during WWII
 Map of WWII POW Camps in the US with links

 01
World War II sites in the United States
United States
United States history-related lists
United States military-related lists
United States Department of Defense lists
World War II